Benin competed at the 2000 Summer Olympics in Sydney, Australia.

Athletics 

Men

Women

Taekwondo

Men's

Tennis

Women

See also
 Benin at the 2000 Summer Paralympics

References
Official Olympic Reports

Nations at the 2000 Summer Olympics
2000
O